"Mixed Emotions" is a popular song by Stuart F. Louchheim, published in 1951.

The best-known version of the song was recorded by Rosemary Clooney on Columbia Records in 1951.  It reached number 22 in the United States.

The song was covered by Ella Fitzgerald, as one side of a single whose other side was also a cover of a Rosemary Clooney hit, "Come On-a My House," on Decca Records (catalog number 27680). An instrumental version was created by Earl Grant on his album, Yes Sirree!

Dinah Washington recorded the song twice, once in the early 1950s, and again in 1961.

Anita Bryant released a version of the song that was the B-side to her 1960 hit "Paper Roses".

References

1951 songs
Rosemary Clooney songs
Ella Fitzgerald songs
Dinah Washington songs
Anita Bryant songs